Ectodermal dysplasia (ED) is a group of genetic syndromes all deriving from abnormalities of the ectodermal structures. More than 150 different syndromes have been identified.

Despite some of the syndromes having different genetic causes, the symptoms are sometimes very similar. Diagnosis is usually by clinical observation, often with the assistance of family medical histories so that it can be determined whether transmission is autosomal dominant or recessive.

Ectodermal dysplasias are described as "heritable conditions in which there are abnormalities of two or more ectodermal structures such as the hair, teeth, nails, sweat glands, salivary glands, cranial-facial structure, digits and other parts of the body."

Presentation

Hair 
Individuals affected by an ED syndrome frequently have abnormalities of the hair follicles. Scalp and body hair may be thin, sparse, and very light in color, even though beard growth in affected males may be normal. The hair may grow very slowly or sporadically and it may be excessively fragile, curly, or even twisted. Kinky hair is also a possibility.

Nails 
Fingernails and toenails may be thick, abnormally shaped, discolored, ridged, slow-growing, or brittle. The cuticles may be prone to infections.

Skin 
The skin may be lightly pigmented. Skin sustaining injury may grow back permanently hypo-pigmented. In some cases, red or brown pigmentation may be present. Skin can be prone to rashes or infections and can be thick over the palms and soles. Care must be taken to prevent cracking, bleeding, and infection.

Sweat glands 
Individuals affected by certain ED syndromes cannot perspire. Their sweat glands may function abnormally or may not have developed at all because of inactive proteins in the sweat glands. Without normal sweat production, the body cannot regulate temperature properly. Therefore, overheating is a common problem, especially during hot weather. Access to cool environments is important.

Salivary glands

Several studies have examined salivary flow rate in individuals and found parotid and submandibular salivary flow ranging from 5 to 15 times lower than average. This is consistent with the salivary glands being of ectodermal origin, although some findings have suggested that there is also mesodermal input.

Teeth 
The development of tooth buds frequently results in congenitally absent teeth (in many cases a lack of a permanent set) and/or in the growth of teeth that are peg-shaped or pointed. The enamel may also be defective. Cosmetic dental treatment is almost always necessary and children may need dentures as early as two years of age. Multiple denture replacements are often needed as the child grows, and dental implants may be an option in adolescence, once the jaw is fully grown. Nowadays the option of extracting the teeth and substituting them with dental implants is quite common. In other cases, teeth can be crowned. Orthodontic treatment also may be necessary. Because dental treatment is complex, a multi-disciplinary approach is best.

Other features 
People with ED often have certain cranial-facial features which can be distinctive: frontal bossing is common, longer or more pronounced chins are frequent, broader noses are also very common. Sunken cheeks, wrinkled hyper pigmented periorbital skin , thick everted protuberant lips are also seen in ED cases .In some types of ED, abnormal development of parts of the eye can result in dryness of the eye, cataracts, and vision defects. Professional eye care can help minimize the effects of ED on vision. Similarly, abnormalities in the development of the ear may cause hearing problems. Respiratory infections can be more common because the normal protective secretions of the mouth and nose are not present. Precautions must be taken to limit infections..

Genetics 
ED can be classified by inheritance (autosomal dominant, autosomal recessive and X-linked) or by which structures are involved (hair, teeth, nails and/or sweat glands).

There are several different types with distinct genetic causes:
 Hay–Wells syndrome (Rapp–Hodgkin syndrome) and EEC syndrome are all associated with TP63.
 Hypohidrotic ectodermal dysplasia can be associated with EDA, EDAR and EDARADD.
 Margarita Island ectodermal dysplasia is associated with PVRL1.
 Ectodermal dysplasia with skin fragility is associated with PKP1.
 Clouston's hidrotic ectodermal dysplasia is associated with GJB6.
 Naegeli syndrome/Dermatopathia pigmentosa reticulariss is associated with KRT14.
 Pachyonychia congenita is caused by multiple keratins.
 Focal dermal hypoplasia is associated with PORCN.
 Ellis–van Creveld syndrome is associated with EVC.
 Palmoplantar ectodermal dysplasia refers to several different conditions selectively affecting the hands and feet.

Diagnosis
In terms of the clinical evaluation, clinical features are the classification method

Treatment
Management for this condition is symptom specific

Society and culture

Notable cases 
 Michael Berryman, American actor with hypohidrotic ectodermal dysplasia
 Levi Hawken, New Zealand skateboarder and artist who became well known in 2011 in New Zealand for the "Nek minnit" viral video on YouTube

See also 
 List of cutaneous conditions
 List of cutaneous conditions caused by mutations in keratins

References

External links 

Genodermatoses
Syndromes affecting teeth
Ectoderm